The 1998–99 2. Bundesliga season was the twenty-fifth season of the 2. Bundesliga, the second tier of the German football league system.

Arminia Bielefeld, SpVgg Unterhaching and SSV Ulm 1846 were promoted to the Bundesliga while FC Gütersloh, KFC Uerdingen 05, SG Wattenscheid 09 and Fortuna Düsseldorf were relegated to the Regionalliga.

League table
For the 1998–99 season SSV Ulm 1846, Rot-Weiß Oberhausen, Hannover 96 and Tennis Borussia Berlin were newly promoted to the 2. Bundesliga from the Regionalliga while Karlsruher SC, 1. FC Köln and Arminia Bielefeld had been relegated to the league from the Bundesliga.

Results

Top scorers 
The league's top scorers:

References

External links
 2. Bundesliga 1998/1999 at Weltfussball.de 
 1998–99 2. Bundesliga  kicker.de

1998-99
2
Germany